A. rubra may refer to:
 Acanthophoenix rubra, the Barbel palm, a critically endangered palm species endemic to Mauritius, Rodrigues and La Reunion
 Actaea rubra, the red baneberry, Chinaberry or doll's eye, a poisonous herbaceous flowering plant species native from northern and western America
 Alnus rubra, the red alder, a deciduous broadleaf tree species native to western North America
 Alleizettella rubra, a plant species endemic to Vietnam
 Aphelodoris rubra, a sea slug species
 Aseroe rubra, the anemone stinkhorn or sea anemone fungus, a fungus species found in Australia

See also
 Rubra (disambiguation)